Bealiba Railway Station was a railway station on the Yelta railway line. It was opened in 1878 when the railway line was extended to St Arnaud and closed in 1981 under the New Deal reorganisation. By 1968, the stationmaster had been removed. The station has been very well preserved and is now leased out as a private residence.

References 

Disused railway stations in Victoria (Australia)